Arkady Nikanorovich Nishchenkov (6 March 1855 – February 1940 was an Imperial Russian general of the artillery and corps commander. He fought in the wars against the Ottoman Empire and the Empire of Japan. From 1914 to 1917 he commanded the Amur Military District.

Awards
Order of Saint Stanislaus (House of Romanov), 1st class, 1904
Order of Saint Anna, 1st class, 1906
Order of Saint Vladimir, 2nd class, 1906
Order of the White Eagle (Russian Empire), 1911
Order of Saint Alexander Nevsky, 1913

Sources
 
 Авилов Р. С. Приамурский военный округ в годы Первой мировой войны: войска и оборонительные задачи. // Вглядываясь в прошлое. Мировые войны ХХ века в истории Дальнего Востока России. Владивосток: ДВО РАН, 2015. С. 5-41. 
 Авилов Р. С., Аюшин Н. Б., Калинин В. И. Владивостокская крепость: войска, фортификация, события, люди. Часть II. Уроки Порт-Артура. 1906—1917 гг. Владивосток: Дальнаука, 2014. — 408 с. + цв. вкл. — (Объем: 54 п.л.) 
 Авилов Р. С., Аюшин Н. Б., Калинин В. И. Владивостокская крепость: войска, фортификация, события, люди. Часть III. «Крепость трех измерений». Владивосток: Дальнаука, 2016.— 518 с. — (Объем: 65 п.л.) 

1855 births
1940 deaths
Russian military personnel of the Russo-Turkish War (1877–1878)
Russian military personnel of the Boxer Rebellion
Russian military personnel of the Russo-Japanese War
Russian military personnel of World War I
People of the Russian Civil War
Recipients of the Order of Saint Stanislaus (Russian), 1st class
Recipients of the Order of St. Anna, 1st class
Recipients of the Order of St. Vladimir, 2nd class
Recipients of the Order of the White Eagle (Russia)